Info is shorthand for "information". It may also refer to:

Computing
 .info, a generic top-level domain
 info:, a URI scheme for information assets with identifiers in public namespaces
 info (Unix), a command used to view documentation produced by GNU Texinfo
 Info.com, a search engine aggregator
 , the filename extension for metadata files used by the Amiga Workbench
 .nfo, a filename extension for informational text files accompanying compressed software.

Other uses
 Info (band), an industrial metal band from Colombia
 .info (magazine), a computer magazine
 Info TV, a Lithuanian news television station
 International Fortean Organization, publishers of the INFO Journal
 Miss Info or Minya Oh, an American radio presenter